Marcello Tolentino Novaes (born 13 August 1962) is a Brazilian actor.

Career 
He studied at the drama school Tablado, along with Malu Mader, Drica Moraes, Maurício Mattar, and Felipe Camargo. His television debut was in 1988 on Vale Tudo telenovela. He has played the same role twice in separate soap operas, both written by Sílvio de Abreu.

His first lead came in 1994, the auto mechanic Raí in Quatro por Quatro. It was during that job he met and fell in love with actress Letícia Spiller. They married and had a son two years later. In 1996, he starred alongside Andréa Beltrão, Humberto Martins and Murilo Benício in the telenovela Vira-Lata (released as Underdog in the USA). He participated in the historical mini-series Chiquinha Gonzaga and the show Andando nas Nuvens in 1999. In 2000, he played the character Beterraba in telenovela Uga Uga. The following year he played Xande in O Clone, the bodyguard and boyfriend of an addicted rich girl. In 2003 he portrayed Ignácio in A Casa das Sete Mulheres and then the rustic Timóteo in Chocolate com Pimenta.

Due to the success of his partnership with author Glória Perez, that begun in O Clone, he returned to act on a show by the author in 2005, but his character left unnoticed in América. The actor showed displeasure with the incident.

He lived the co-star Vicente de Sete Pecados and then the surfer Sandro in Três Irmãs.

Filmography 
2007: Sambando nas Brasas, Morô? .... Pedro
2008: O Guerreiro Didi e a Ninja Lili .... Dr. Marcos
2010: Desenrola .... Gabriel
2014: Casa Grande .... Hugo Cavalcanti

Television

Soap 
1988: Vale Tudo .... André
1989: Top Model .... Felipe
1990: Rainha da Sucata .... Geraldo
1992: Deus nos Acuda .... Geraldo
1994-1995: Quatro por Quatro .... Raí
1996: Vira-Lata .... Fidel
1997-1998: Zazá .... Hugo Guerreiro
1999: Andando nas Nuvens .... Raul Pedreira
2000: Uga-Uga.... Beterraba
2001-2002: O Clone .... Xande
2003-2004: Chocolate com Pimenta .... Timóteo Mariano da Silva e Silva
2005: América .... Geninho
2007-2008: Sete Pecados .... Vicente de Freitas
2008-2009: Três Irmãs.... Sandro
2009-2010: Cama de Gato .... Bene
2011: Cordel Encantado .... Qui Qui
2012: Avenida Brasil .... Maxwell "Max" Oliveira
2014: Casa Grande .... Hugo
2015: A Regra do Jogo .... Vavá
2016: Sol Nascente .... Vittorio
2017-2018: O Outro Lado do Paraíso .... Renan
2018-2019: O Sétimo Guardião .... Sampaio Gomes
2022: Além da Ilusão .... Eugênio Barbosa

Miniseries and serials 
1992: Anos Rebeldes.... Olavo
1998: Malhação .... Paulinho Kelé
1999: Chiquinha Gonzaga.... Jacinto Ribeiro do Amaral
2003: A Casa das Sete Mulheres.... Ignácio
2006: Malhação .... Daniel San Martin

Special 
1998: Sai de Baixo .... Godzilla
2004: Sob Nova Direção .... Flávio
2008: Guerra e Paz.... Rolandão
2008: Casos e Acasos.... Reinaldo / Paulo
2008: Dicas de um Sedutor.... Mauro

References

External links 

1962 births
Living people
Male actors from Rio de Janeiro (city)
Brazilian male television actors